Pristimantis crucifer is a species of frog in the family Strabomantidae.
It is endemic to Ecuador.
Its natural habitats are tropical moist montane forests and rivers.
It is threatened by habitat loss.

References

crucifer
Amphibians of Ecuador
Endemic fauna of Ecuador
Vulnerable animals
Vulnerable biota of South America
Amphibians described in 1899
Taxonomy articles created by Polbot